Powerband is a Formula 1-style racing game for the Acorn Archimedes published in 1990. It was written by Gordon J. Key and published by The Fourth Dimension. The game was released on a single 3.5" floppy disc.

Gameplay
The game involved racing against 11 AI cars around circuits for a set number of laps (between 1 and 99), aiming to finish ahead of as many as possible. All cars were of the same generic design but featured differing simple colour schemes. As the game was unlicensed driver names were created for the game, based on puns (Ali Rimms, Terbie Blower, Cruncher Gears, Torson Barrs, Eeza Weaver, Wilson Phyre), though actual circuits were used. The game had three modes - Fun, Race and Championship. The former allowed racing with any permutation of laps, car modifications, invincibility etc.; the latter a set series of races with a points-scoring system. Race mode effectively created a non-championship race. Colliding with another car would penalise the player in that his car would stand still for a few seconds and the rival would continue; colliding with a barrier head-on on either Race or Championship modes would result in the destruction of the player's car. Limited mechanical failures were also incorporated into the game, as was tyre wear - while the game featured no pit stops choosing soft compound tyres for a long race would result in a loss of grip.

The car had a limited number of modification options, including engine size, tyre type, gearbox type, steering ratio, wing positioning etc. Some of these options - such as "Va-Voom" engines, Pythonesque steering (which made the car do the opposite to the gamer's mouse movements) and limpet tyres were only available on Fun mode. The game featured no testing/practice option, with grid positions chosen at random and the Fun mode intended for learning of circuits. The game's pause screen featured a track map informing the player of his position and those of the other cars.

While the game was unlicensed it did feature primitive recreations of numerous circuits used for Formula 1 races, including Monaco, Silverstone, Brands Hatch, Hockenheim, Paul Ricard, Adelaide, Detroit, Suzuka, Spa, the Hungaroring, Montreal, Buenos Aires, Interlagos - plus Wellington in New Zealand. Twelve of the sixteen featured circuits would be chosen at random and in a random order for a championship season.

Controls
As with E-Type the player took control of the car using the mouse. The three Acorn mouse buttons represent (from left) the Clutch, Brake and Accelerator. This adds to the "realism" of the game as this corresponds to the typical layout of the car's foot pedals. Keyboard keys were used for gear changes (in Manual or Electronic gearbox mode).

Acorn Archimedes games
The Fourth Dimension (company) games
Racing video games
Single-player video games
Video games developed in the United Kingdom